Smyrna Airport  is a public general aviation and military use airport located two nautical miles (4 km) north of the central business district of Smyrna, a town in Rutherford County, Tennessee, United States. It is owned by the Smyrna / Rutherford County Airport Authority. Smyrna Airport is the third largest airport in Tennessee and is the state's busiest general aviation airport.  Prior to March 1971, the facility was an active military installation known as Sewart Air Force Base.

This airport is included in the National Plan of Integrated Airport Systems for 2011–2015, which categorized it as a reliever airport for Nashville International Airport, which is located twelve nautical miles (22 km) to the north.

Military use 
Smyrna Airport currently operates as a joint use facility with a Tennessee Army National Guard helicopter unit, Army Aviation Support Facility #1 (AASF#1), which operates 60 helicopters with 300 full-time Army National Guard personnel.

The airport previously served as an outlying Air National Guard training facility for C-130 Hercules aircraft of the 118th Airlift Wing (now redesignated the 118th Wing) of the Tennessee Air National Guard at Berry Field Air National Guard Base at Nashville International Airport until the wing's termination of C-130 operations in 2012.  The airport also continues to support training operations by C-17 Globemaster III aircraft of the Tennessee Air National Guard's 164th Airlift Wing at Memphis Air National Guard Base at the Memphis International Airport.

The Tennessee Army National Guard also leases part of the airport to maintain the Grubbs/Kyle Training Center.  This facility supports 24 different units and 1,270 assigned Army National Guard personnel, 162 of which are full-time, as well as numerous military aircraft.

Facilities and aircraft 
Smyrna Airport covers an area of 1,700 acres (688 ha) at an elevation of 543 feet (166 m) above mean sea level. It has two asphalt paved runways 14/32 is 8,048 (grooved) by 150 feet (2,453 x 46 m) and 1/19 is 5,546 by 100 feet (1,690 x 30 m). It also has one helipad designated H1 with a concrete surface measuring 40 by 40 feet (12 x 12 m).

For the 12-month period ending June 30, 2017, the airport had 86,964 aircraft operations, an average of 238 per day: 89% general aviation, 5% military, 5% air taxi, and <1% scheduled commercial. At that time there were 160 aircraft based at this airport: 87 single-engine, 27 multi-engine, 12 jet, 2 helicopter, 2 glider, and 30 military.

The airport has an operational control tower from 7am to 10pm on weekdays and 7am to 7pm on weekends, a precision instrument landing system (ILS) approach to Runway 32, and DoD Into-Plane Contract jet fuel for military and other US Government aircraft provided by the on-site civilian fixed-base operator (FBO), Contour Flight Management.

Accidents and incidents 
 On June 2, 2016, while practicing for an upcoming air show at the airport, United States Navy Blue Angels #6, an F/A-18 Hornet, crashed on the grounds of the Sam Davis Home, a nearby historic site. The pilot of the plane, USMC Capt. Jeff Kuss, was killed as a result of the crash. The incident occurred just after takeoff while Capt. Kuss was performing the Split-S maneuver. The Navy investigation found that he had performed the maneuver too low while failing to retard the throttle out of afterburner, causing him to fall too fast and recover too low above the ground. Capt. Kuss ejected, but his parachute was immediately engulfed in flames, causing him to fall to his death. His body was recovered multiple yards away from the crash site. The cause of death was blunt force trauma to the head. The investigation also cited weather and pilot fatigue as additional causes of the crash. There were neither casualties nor severe property damage on the ground, as the plane went down in an empty field. The Town of Smyrna has erected a permanent memorial to Capt. Kuss near the airport, which includes a decommissioned F/A-18 Hornet identical to the aircraft destroyed in the crash, painted in the Blue Angels #6 livery.
 On May 29, 2021, a Cessna Citation 501, registered N66BK, crashed into nearby Percy Priest Lake soon after takeoff. All seven occupants on board died, including Gwen Shamblin Lara and her husband Joe Lara. The investigation into the crash is ongoing.

References

External links 

 Smyrna/Rutherford County Airport
 Hollingshead Aviation FBO
 Aerial image as of February 1999 from USGS The National Map
 
 

Airports in Tennessee
Buildings and structures in Rutherford County, Tennessee
Smyrna, Tennessee
Airports established in 1971
1971 establishments in Tennessee
Transportation in Rutherford County, Tennessee